Kasidre Kailasa is a 1971 Indian Kannada-language film, directed by K. Janakiram and produced by K. Janakiram. The film stars Rajkumar, Udaykumar, Vanisri and Pandari Bai. The film has musical score by Chellapilla Satyam.

The film was remade in Hindi in 1976 as Sabse Bada Rupaiya by S. Ramanathan , the brother of Kannada actor Shivaram. The 2021 Kannada movie titled 1980 uses a sequence of this movie being telecasted on the television - a dialogue by Udaykumar to Rajkumar about not to  believe the near and dear ones blindly without knowing their intention - as a technique of foreshadowing.

Cast

Rajkumar
Udaykumar
Vanisri
Pandari Bai
B. Jaya
Narasimharaju
Srinath
Nagappa
Bangalore Nagesh
M. S. Sathya
Jayaram
Shyam
Bharadwaj
Ganapathi Bhat
Guggu
Mahadevappa
B. N. Raju
Kanchana
Halam
Saroja

Soundtrack
The music was composed by Satyam.

References

External links
 
 

1971 films
1970s Kannada-language films
Films scored by Satyam (composer)
Kannada films remade in other languages